The Goupy No.2 was an experimental aircraft designed by  and  and  built in France in 1909 at the Blériot factory at Buc. The Goupy No.2 is significant for two major and influential innovations in aircraft design: it was the first tractor configuration biplane to fly and the first biplane to feature staggered wings, built with a landing gear configuration nearly identical in appearance to the Blériot XI monoplane, flown earlier that year. While both these features would very soon become the norm in aircraft design, the No.2 was described in the aviation press at the time as having a "somewhat unusual design". The only features that would not be typical of aircraft in the years to come would be its biplane tail unit, and the whole-chord wingtip ailerons fitted to both upper and lower wings. The uncovered wood box-girder fuselage, typical of early aircraft, was later covered.

It first flew in March 1909, and the following year was displayed at the Paris Salon. It flew competitively at the 1910 Reims air show, and made exhibition flights at British aviation meets at Burton and Doncaster, piloted by Emile Ladougne. 
The Goupy No.3 differed only in detail: the biplane tail was replaced by a single elevator, the undercarriage was modified, and changes were made to the controls.

Specifications

References

Further reading

 

1900s French experimental aircraft
Goupy aircraft
Aircraft first flown in 1909
Biplanes
Single-engined tractor aircraft